Anthony W. Petruccelli (born October 2, 1972) is an American politician who served as a Massachusetts state senator for the First Suffolk and Middlesex district, which includes his neighborhood of East Boston and parts of Revere, Winthrop, and Cambridge. He is a Democrat who served from 2007–2016. In 2016, Petrucelli left the Senate to join a Boston lobbying firm. Prior to serving in the Senate, he was a state representative from 1999 to 2007.
Petruccelli was born and raised in East Boston, parents are Richard and Dianne (Tanner) Petruccelli.  He is one of four children, Richard, Debra and Diana.  
He attended East Boston Central Catholic School, Boston Latin, and Boston College High School, where he was a 3 sport varsity athlete.  He attended and played football at the University of Rochester in Rochester, NY.  Upon completing 4 years at the University of Rochester, he returned home where he served as a Community Liaison for the East Boston Neighborhood to Mayor Thomas Menino.

He is currently living in East Boston with his wife, Alessandra (Coppola), and his two children Alexa and Anthony.

References

1972 births
Living people
People from East Boston, Boston
Democratic Party Massachusetts state senators
Democratic Party members of the Massachusetts House of Representatives